William Randolph (1650-1711) was an early colonist, landowner, planter, merchant, and politician in Virginia.

William Randolph may also refer to:

William Randolph II (1681–1741), American planter and politician, son of William Randolph
William Randolph III (son of William) (born c. 1710), owner of Wilton plantation house
William Randolph III (son of Thomas) (born 1712), owner of Tuckahoe plantation
William Millican Randolph (1893–1928), U.S. Army aviator

See also
 William Randolph Hearst (disambiguation)
Randolph family of Virginia